The Emergency Service Medal (Irish: An Bonn Seirbhíse Éigeandála) is a military decoration of the Republic of Ireland that was awarded to servicemen who served during The Emergency from 1939 to 1946.

Due to faulty record keeping during the period, the total number of Medals issued is not known.

Description 

The medal is made of bronze, on the front there is an image of a woman with a dog beside her, along the top the words "Re na Práinne" are inscribed in Irish. On the back there is an olive branch with "1939" to one side of it, and "1946" to the other. At the top there are words inscribed in Irish, the words are different across the 11 variants, with each being the Irish name of the organisation or group the individual who received the medal is a member of. The example Medal shown reads "An Fórsa Cosanta Áitiúil", which was the Irish name for the Local Security Forces.

The Ribbon is scarlet red with 1 or 2 white stripes in the center. The ribbons for the Local Security Forces, Air Raid Precautions Agency, First Aid Division of the Irish Red Cross and the Volunteer Aid Division of the Irish Red Cross all have one large stripe, while the rest of the ribbons have two smaller disconnected stripes.

There is a bar at the top of all Medals, which reads "Serbís Náisiúnta". If an individual completed an extra two years of service during The Emergency, then they would be awarded an extra bar with "1939-1946" inscribed on the front. Up to two extra bars could be earned, both having the same design.

Eligibility 
The medal was eligible for Members of the 26th Infantry Battalion and Navy and Air Corps for 1 year of service. While members of the Reserve Defence Forces, the Local Security Force, the Air Raid Precautions Agency, the Maritime Inscription, the Second Line Reserve, the First Aid Division of Irish Red Cross, the Volunteer Aid Division of Irish Red Cross, the Army Nursing Service and the Chaplaincy Service were awarded it after 2 years of service.

References 

Orders, decorations, and medals of Ireland